The dwarf gymnure (Hylomys parvus) is a gymnure found only at Mount Kerinci, Sumatra, Indonesia. It is listed by the International Union for Conservation of Nature as a critically endangered species due to a restricted range.

The dwarf gymnure was first described as a separate taxon in 1916, but it was not considered a valid species until it was more closely examined in 1994.

This small animal, measuring only 4-5 inches, has a foul scent, especially when threatened. It has an average lifespan of about 2 years and a gestation period of about 30–35 days.

References

Hylomys
Mammals of Indonesia
Mammals of Asia
Mammals described in 1916